White Willow is a Norwegian art rock band, mixing elements of orchestral pop, 1970s progressive rock, jazz-rock and even electronic elements.

White Willow's influences range from 10cc, The Beach Boys, Big Star and Steely Dan to King Crimson, Magma, Weather Report and even Nick Drake and Joni Mitchell. Typical of their sound is the prominence of female vocals, flute and mellotrons and analog synthesizers.

Many guest artists have appeared on White Willow's albums. They include Norwegian singer/songwriter Finn Coren, British art-pop vocalist Tim Bowness, and US avant-rock guitarist Michael S. Judge.

Band members

Current band members
Venke Knutson - vocals
Lars Fredrik Frøislie - keyboards
Ketil Einarsen - flutes
Jacob Holm-Lupo - guitars
Ellen Andrea Wang - bass
Mattias Olsson - drums

Former band members

Sylvia Erichsen - vocals
Trude Eidtang - vocals
Marthe Berger Walthinsen - bass
Aage Moltke Schou - drums
Erik Holm - drums
Danny Young - drums
Alexander Engebretsen - bass
Per Christian Stenberg - bass
Eldrid Johansen - vocals
Sara Trondal - vocals
Tirill Mohn - violin
Audun Kjus - flute and vocals
Jan Tariq Rahman - keyboards, bass, woodwinds and vocals (founding member)

Discography 
 Ignis Fatuus (1995, The Laser's Edge)
 Ex Tenebris (1998, The Laser's Edge)
 Sacrament (2000, The Laser's Edge)
 Storm Season (2004, The Laser's Edge; Japanese version released through Avalon/Marquee)
 Signal to Noise (2006, The Laser's Edge)
 Terminal Twilight (2011, Termo Records)
 Occultations: An Introduction to White Willow (2015, White Willow) 
 Future Hopes (2017, The Laser's Edge)

References

External links 
 White Willow on Facebook

Norwegian progressive rock groups

Musical groups from Norway with local place of origin missing 
Musical groups with year of establishment missing